Peters's banded skink (Scincopus fasciatus) is a skink found in the monotypic genus Scincopus.

References

External links 
 RDB: Scincopus fasciatus (PETERS, 1864)
 Clint's Reptiles: Peter's Banded Skink

Skinks of Africa
Reptiles described in 1864
Taxa named by Wilhelm Peters